
Lee & Shepard (1862-1905) was a publishing and bookselling firm in Boston, Massachusetts, in the 19th century, established by William Lee (1826–1906) and Charles Augustus Billings Shepard (1829–1889) Authors published by the firm included: George Melville Baker; Sophie May; Henry Morgan; Oliver Optic; William Carey Richards; Francis Henry Underwood; Madeline Leslie and Levina Buoncuore Urbino. The business conducted its operations from offices at 149 Washington St. (ca.1872); the corner of Franklin and Hawley St. (1873–1885); and "adjoining the Old South," no.10 Milk St. (ca.1885).

One of the first titles issued by the firm was the diary of Adam Gurowski, reviewed in 1862 by the New York Evening Post: "This work is a crabbed specimen of authorship. ... The humor of it is sometimes that of Thersites, when his thorny tongue lashed the heroes of the camp, and sometimes that of Caliban when he cursed the arts of his superiors. ... Yet it is a book to be carefully read. Under its rough and prickly burr there is a nutritive nut."

In 1905 Lee & Shepard merged with the Lothrop Company to form Lothrop, Lee & Shepard.

Lothrop, Lee & Shepard was eventually acquired by William Morrow and Company, which would be acquired by HarperCollins in 1999. Lothrop shut down its children's division soon after the acquisition. Lothrop is now an Imprint of Harpercollins.

Further reading

Published by the firm
 Adam Gurowski. Diary from March 4, 1861 to November 12, 1862. 1862. 
 My teacher's gem. 1863. Engraving by Kilburn.
 Charles R. Baker (of the Dorchester Nurseries). Practical and scientific fruit culture. 1866. (Some of the illustrations were derived from the Gardeners' Chronicle, 1847)
 Sophie May. Cousin Grace. 1866. Engraving by N. Brown.
 Henry Morgan. Ned Nevins: the news boy, or, Street life in Boston. Boston: Lee & Shepard, 1867. 
 John Townsend Trowbridge. Neighbor's wives. 1867
 John Frost. Life of Daniel Webster: the statesman and the patriot. 1868.
 Oliver Optic. Our standard-bearer: or, the life of General Ulysses S. Grant. 1868. Illus. by Thomas Nast.
John Bunyon. Pilgrim's Progress (1871)
 Our Boys and Girls.  v.11-12 (1872).
 Adeline Trafton. An American Girl Abroad (1872)
 Eleanor W. Talbot. My lady's casket of jewels and flowers for her adorning. 1885. Includes color plates.
 Oliver Optic's Magazine. v.17-18 (1875).
 Irene E. Jerome. One Year's Sketch Book. 1885.
 Harriet Stewart Miner. Orchids: the Royal Family of Plants. 1885
 Irving Bacheller (1900) Eben Holden, A Tale of the North Country (a Lothrop book)
 John Townsend Trowbridge. The Little Master. 1887
 Oliver Optic. Poor and Proud (1872)
 Madame Eugénie Foa. The Boy Life of Napoleon: Afterwards Emperor of the French  (1895).
 Laurence Gronlund. The Co-operative Commonwealth: An Exposition of Socialism (1900)
 Edith Thacher Hurd, illustrated by Clement Hurd. Engine Engine No. 9 (1940)

Images

See also

References

External links

 WorldCat. Lee and Shepard
 American Antiquarian Society. Lee and Shepard. Business records, 1860s-1906.

Publishing companies established in 1862
Financial District, Boston
19th century in Boston
Companies based in Boston
Defunct book publishing companies of the United States
Cultural history of Boston
Book publishing companies based in Massachusetts
Publishing companies disestablished in 1905
Defunct companies based in Massachusetts
1862 establishments in Massachusetts
1905 disestablishments in Massachusetts